CQ DL is a monthly amateur radio enthusiast magazine published in Germany.

References 

Amateur radio magazines
Monthly magazines published in Germany